Nain County is in Isfahan province, Iran. The capital of the county is the city of Nain. At the 2006 census, the county's population was 54,298 in 15,919 households. The following census in 2011 counted 38,077 people in 12,123 households, by which time Khur and Biabanak District had been separated from the county to form Khur and Biabanak County. At the 2016 census, the county's population was 39,261 in 13,378 households.

Administrative divisions

The population history and structural changes of Nain County's administrative divisions over three consecutive censuses are shown in the following table. The latest census shows two districts, five rural districts, and three cities.

References

 

Counties of Isfahan Province